NGC 257 is a spiral galaxy in the Pisces constellation. It was discovered on December 29, 1790, by Frederick William Herschel.

References

Notes

External links 
 

Astronomical objects discovered in 1790
Pisces (constellation)
Spiral galaxies
002818
00493
0257